Heinze is a surname. Notable people with the surname include:

 Alonso Heinze (born 1948), Mexican sprint canoer 
 Andrew R. Heinze (born 1955), American scholar
 Sir Bernard Heinze (1894–1982), Australian conductor and musical administrator
 Cheryll Heinze (1946–2012), American politician
 F. Augustus Heinze (1869–1914), American entrepreneur
 Gabriel Heinze (born 1978), Argentine footballer
 Gerhard Heinze (born 1948), German footballer
 Gus Heinze (born 1926), American photorealist painter
 Kevin Heinze (1928–2008), Australian television presenter
 Lasse Heinze (born 1986), Danish footballer
 Martin Heinze (born 1983), Danish footballer
 Nathan Heinze, American house music and synthpop producer
 Otto Heinze (1877–1968), Estonian military commander
 Ralph Heinze (born 1975), Mexican sprint canoer 
 Richard Heinze (1867–1929), German philologist
 Roberto Heinze (born 1946), Mexican sprint canoer
 Rüdiger Heinze (born 1971), German film producer and screenwriter
 Rudolf Heinze (1865–1925), German politician
 Steve Heinze (born 1970), American ice hockey player
 Suse Heinze (born 1920), German diver
 Timo Heinze (born 1986), German footballer
 Úrsula Heinze (born 1941), German writer and translator

See also 
 Heinz (disambiguation)
 Heinze, a rack or trestle for drying hay
 Heinzer, a person who racks or dries hay
 Heinze Islands, a group of four islands which are part of the Moscos Islands in the Andaman Sea off the coast of Burma
 Heinze River, a river in Burma

Surnames from given names